Bulbophyllum ericssonii is a species of orchid in the genus Bulbophyllum that grows from Malesia to New Guinea.

References

The Bulbophyllum-Checklist
The Internet Orchid Species Photo Encyclopedia

ericssonii